Fredi 'Kruga' Nwaka is a British film director, film Producer, actor and ex-rapper.

Career
Fredi Nwaka started his career as a rapper and he was the only British rapper to be signed to the Wu Tang Clan. Before that he was a bodyguard for many years and have looked after Biggie Small, TLC, Donnel Jones, 50 Cent. Later, he began acting and has acted in several movies.

Fredi wrote, produced and directed several short films as well as two feature films. Fredi is also the CEO of Gridloc Enterprise Ltd which produces films and TV content as well an events agency Nwaka Nights.

Filmography

Awards

|-
| 2014
| Leadership and Community Work in Film Industry
| NEL UK 
| 
|-
| 2014
| Film Director of the Year
| Ebony Business Recognition Award
| 
|-
| 2014
| Father of the Year
| BYA
| 
|-
| 2016
| Best Film Director
| International Achievers Award
| 
|-
| 2015
| Best International Film for AWOL
| GI Film Festival 
| 
|-
| 2016
| Featured Film: If Only
| BEFTA
| 
|-
| 2015
| Best edited film for AWOL
| 3rd Annual Las Vegas Black Film Festival
| 
|-
| 2017
| Film Mention Award
| Romford Film Festival
| 
|-
| 2016
| Best Short Film
| BEFFTA
| 
|-
| 2015
| Best Film Producer
| C-Hub Awards
|

References

Living people
British film actors
British film directors
British film producers
Year of birth missing (living people)